William Lee Bryant Jr. (born 1957) is an American businessman and politician from the state of Washington. A Republican, he served on the Seattle Port Commission from 2008 to 2016. In the 2016 Washington gubernatorial election, as one of the top two finishers in the blanket primary, he participated in the general election, losing to incumbent Democrat Jay Inslee.

Early life and education
Bryant was born in Morton, Washington, and attended Capital High School in Olympia. He earned a degree in trade and diplomacy from Georgetown University's School of Foreign Service.

Political career

Bryant was first elected to the Port of Seattle Commission in 2007, narrowly defeating incumbent Alec Fisken. He was reelected in 2011 against Democrat Dean Willard with over 60% of the vote, a remarkable share for a Republican in King County.

Gubernatorial campaign

On May 14, 2015, Bryant announced his campaign for Governor of Washington in the 2016 election, running as a Republican. He has made reduction of traffic congestion and traffic noise on the 520 bridge as major goals of his campaign. Bryant also supported same-sex marriage as well as abortion rights and opposed capital punishment, placing him in the socially liberal faction of the Republican Party, while opposing raising the statewide minimum wage, making him fiscally conservative. On November 8, 2016, Bryant lost the election to incumbent Democrat Jay Inslee, receiving 45.5% of the vote to Inslee's 54.2%. Bryant won 30 of 39 counties, with many of his greatest margins in Washington's most rural areas. Inslee won 68% of the vote in King County, Washington's largest, which proved decisive. Bryant remains the last Republican gubernatorial candidate in Washington to come within single digits of winning.

References

External links

1957 births
21st-century American politicians
Candidates in the 2016 United States elections
Living people
People from Morton, Washington
Walsh School of Foreign Service alumni
Washington (state) Republicans